The Governor of Santa Fe is a citizen of Santa Fe Province, in Argentina, holding the office of governor for the corresponding period. Currently the governor of Santa Fe is Omar Perotti, of the Justicialist Party.

According to the provincial constitution (sanctioned in 1962), the governor is elected by the simple majority of the popular vote, along with a vice governor, for a four-year term, and cannot be re-elected consecutively. The governor must be a native Argentine citizen or the child of a native citizen, and must either have been born in the province or resided continuously in the province during the two years prior to the election.

List of caudillos

List of governors

Governors since 1983

See also
 Legislature of Santa Fe
 Senate of Santa Fe
 Chamber of Deputies of Santa Fe

References

 
Santa Fe